The 1997 Davidoff Swiss Indoors was a men's tennis tournament played on indoor carpet courts at the St. Jakobshalle in Basel, Switzerland that was part of the World Series of the 1997 ATP Tour. It was the 28th edition of the tournament and was held from 29 September until 5 October 1996. Fourth-seeded Greg Rusedski won the singles title.

Finals

Singles

 Greg Rusedski defeated  Mark Philippoussis 6–3, 7–6(8–6), 7–6(7–3)
 It was Rusedski's 2nd singles title of the year and the 5th of his career.

Doubles

 Tim Henman /  Marc Rosset defeated  Karsten Braasch /  Jim Grabb 7–6, 6–7, 7–6

References

External links
 ITF tournament edition profile

Davidoff Swiss Indoors
Swiss Indoors
1997 in Swiss tennis
1997 Davidoff Swiss Indoors